Babers is a surname. Notable people with the surname include:

 Alonzo Babers (born 1961), American athlete
 Dino Babers (born 1961), American football coach
 Henry Babers (born 1957), American Christian evangelist
 Rod Babers, American football cornerback

See also
 Baber (disambiguation)